The 2009 FIA European Touring Car Cup was the fifth running of the FIA European Touring Car Cup. It was held on 25 October 2009 at the Circuito Vasco Sameiro near Braga in Portugal. James Thompson won the event after winning the second race. Norbert Michelisz won the first race.

Entry list

† Although in attendance, Radermecker did not compete due to a technical problem with his car.

‡ Despite entering the event, Fontes did not attend.

Report

Qualifying
SEAT Leon Eurocup champion Norbert Michelisz took pole position from Franz Engstler at the very end of the session. Bamboo Engineering pairing Duarte Félix Da Costa and Harry Vaulkhard locked out the second row of the grid. Pre-event favourites James Thompson and Michel Nykjær qualified down in sixth and eighth respectively. Vincent Radermecker was forced to sit out the session due to problems with his Chevrolet Lacetti.

Classification

Race 1

Final standings

References

External links
Official website of the FIA European Touring Car Cup

European Touring Car Cup
European Touring Car Cup
European Touring Car Cup
2009 in European sport